Masillaraptor is an extinct genus of masillaraptorid, a groups basal falconiforms, from the Middle Eocene Messel Pit, Germany. It is a long-legged relative of the living falcons.

Known species 
Only one species of Masillaraptor is known: M. parvunguis

Etymology 
Masillaraptor comes from the Latin word Masilla, which is the old name for the town of Messel, and raptor is a New Latin suffix used to indicate a predator (from rapere, to catch) and in English it means bird of prey.

Specific epithet parvunguis is also Latin, coming from the word parvus which means small and feeble, while unguis means claw.

The name refers to the fact that the specimen's claws are small in comparison to those of other raptors.

Characteristics
The genus Masillaraptor is different from all other known avian taxa. It possesses a combination of characters that distinguishes it from all others.

1. The beak is almost as long as the cranium itself, with equal height over much of its length and a straight dorsal ridge. The beak curves just before its tip, restricting the nasal openings to the rear half of the beak.

2. The tibiotarsus is the longest bone in the leg.

3. On the second toe the first phalanx is shortened, whereas on the fourth toe the second and third phalanges are shortened.

4. The claws of Masillaraptor are small and weak compared to other falconiform birds with abbreviated pedal phalanges.

Characters (1) and (3) are derived within neornithine birds and also found in modern Accipitres, from which Masillaraptor is, however, distinguished in character (4).(Mayr, 2006.)

Fossil specimens 
There are two specimens of Masillaraptor. Only one specimen was referenced for classification because the other is housed in an unknown private collection.  Both specimens are a slab of rock containing a nearly complete, articulate but poorly preserved skeleton. The specimens are both believed to be adult members of the species. Both specimens were discovered in the Messel pit, an old shale mine known for the extremely well preserved fossils that have been discovered there. It is hoped that more specimens will be discovered and more will be learned about these prehistoric birds.

Classification
Masillaraptor represents one of two members of Masillaraptoridae within the Falconiformes. The cladogram below displays the results of the phylogenetic analysis by Mayr & Kitchener (2022):

References

External links
dinoweb
The Raptor Center
Falconiformes
Messel fossil bird
Explore Birds of Prey

Eocene birds
Falconiformes
Prehistoric birds of Europe
Fossil taxa described in 2006